The University City Public Library is a public library in University City, Missouri, near the Delmar Loop.  Established in 1939, the library holds more than 150,000 books. It offers several activities and services for all ages.

It is a member of the Municipal Library Consortium of St. Louis County, nine independent libraries in St. Louis County.

References

External links

 Official site
 Libraries.org | https://librarytechnology.org/library/1829

Public libraries in Missouri
Libraries in Greater St. Louis
Municipal Library Consortium of St. Louis County
Buildings and structures in St. Louis County, Missouri
1939 establishments in Missouri